Sheets Public School District 14 was a school district in Slope County, North Dakota. It operated one of the two schools in the county, Cottage School.

Cottage School was a one room schoolhouse. It was established circa 1907. In 1999 it had five students. It closed after its last classes on May 17, 2005. It had two students at the time of closing. The final superintendent was Kathy Walser.

Campus
In 1999 it had three computers and a television.

Operations
The parents sat on the school board and vetted candidates for teachers.

The district relied on parents to transport children and provide lunches as it had no buses and no cafeteria.

Culture
Josh Hoffner of the Associated Press wrote that the school had a "family atmosphere" and that students received individualized attention.

See also
 Central Elementary Public School District 32 (Amidon School), another one room schoolhouse and the other school in Slope County (the district was dissolved in 2020)

References

Slope County, North Dakota
Former school districts in North Dakota
2000s disestablishments in North Dakota
2005 disestablishments in the United States
One-room schoolhouses in North Dakota
School districts disestablished in 2005